The  ("Indigenous Regular Forces"), known simply as the  (Regulars), are volunteer infantry units of the Spanish Army, largely recruited in the cities of Ceuta and Melilla. Consisting of indigenous infantry and cavalry recruited in Spanish Morocco, forming part of the Army of Africa and officered by Spaniards, these troops played a significant role in the Spanish Civil War (1936–1939).

History

Establishment 
The Regulares were first raised in 1911 as a "batallón indígena" of infantry. Their formation came at a time when the Spanish army was expanding into the Moroccan hinterland from the long-held coastal enclaves of Ceuta and Melilla. Previously use had been made of Moroccan auxiliaries as scouts and the designation of "regulars" appears to have been intended to distinguish the newly raised force as a permanent unit of the Spanish army. Officers and some NCOs were seconded from Peninsular regiments. By 1914 four Groups (the equivalent of a regiment) had been raised for active service. While the Regulares remained predominantly infantry, recognition of Moroccan skills as horsemen led to the establishment of cavalry squadrons. This mounted element of the Regulares was to remain a conspicuous feature throughout the period of Spanish rule of the protectorate. As such, each Group was composed of a headquarters and service company, two infantry Tabors (battalions) and a cavalry Tabor (squadron) plus a military band and Corps of Drums attached to the regimental headquarters. From 1914 to 1922 the Regulares were expanded in numbers to five "Grupos" based respectively in Melilla, Tetuán, Ceuta, Alhucemas and Larache (the Alhucemas Group was raised in 1921).

The Regulares infantry were known for their ability to traverse "dead ground" without being detected, but their Spanish officers disliked unconventional warfare and only infrequently took advantage of this skill.

Rif Wars 
The Moroccan troops generally remained loyal during the Rif War of the early 1920s, although there were reports of mutiny at Yat el Bax following the major Spanish defeat at the Battle of Annual in 1921. During this period the Regulares and the Spanish Legion ("Tercio") emerged as the elite corps of the Spanish Army - long-serving professionals on more or less continuous active service, attracting the best officers. These included the future  Francisco Franco who served initially with the Regulares (from 1913) before transferring to the newly raised Tercio (whose troops were mostly Spaniards) as second in command and commander of its 1st Battalion in 1920.

In 1923 a detachment of the Fuerzas Regulares de Ceuta mounted guard at the Royal Palace in Madrid, indicating the high-profile achieved by the Moroccan troops. In 1934 cavalry and infantry of the Regulares were brought to Peninsular Spain by the Republican Government to assist in the suppression of the rising by Asturian miners that year.

Spanish Civil War 
In 1936 the Spanish "Army of Africa" (totaling 30,000 in the Legion and Moroccan Regulares regiments) formed part of the rebellion led by General Franco against the Republican Government in Madrid. In the crucial initial phase of the Spanish Civil War, the rebels were able to airlift a significant number of Moroccan troops plus legionnaires across the Straits of Gibraltar, with German and Italian assistance, in order to become the shock troops of the Nationalist battles. The professionalism and brutality of the Army of Africa played a major part in early Nationalist successes. As the war continued five more  of Regulares infantry were raised plus two of cavalry (the 1st Cavalry Group based in Teutan and the 2nd Cavalry Group in Melilla).

The Regulares with their experience of North African warfare proved to be excellent combatants in the open countryside while advancing from Seville to Madrid during August - November 1936. However they subsequently proved less adapt at street fighting in unfamiliar urban environments. With the raising of substantial Nationalist forces in mainland Spain the role of the Regulares diminished but they retained a key function as shock troops until the end of the Civil War. Conspicuous in Franco's victory parade in Madrid in 1939, the Regulares were the most decorated units of the Nationalist forces. The numbers of the Army of Africa doubled in the course of the war to about 60,000.

In Francoist Spain 
Following the Nationalist victory the Regulares were reduced in number but retained their structure. Franco authorized the establishment of a ceremonial mounted honour guard ("Guardia de Su Excelencia el Generalísimo") from the Regulares cavalry which, with colourful Moorish uniforms and white Arabian horses, served in close attendance on him and formed part of his guards unit.

With the independence of Morocco in 1956 the majority of the Moroccan personnel of the Regulares, numbering about 12,500, were transferred to the newly raised Royal Moroccan Armed Forces. The two cavalry units were disbanded and the Groups were reduced to just eight.

Present day 
 

Spain retained the historic enclaves of Melilla and Ceuta and the reduced Groups of Tetuan, Melilla, Ceuta and Alhucemas remained in existence as part of the two garrisons.

As part of a wider reorganisation of the Spanish Army in 1986, the existing 4 Regulares Groups were amalgamated into two light infantry regiments within the present day Spanish Army, which exist to this very day. Their active personnel are Spanish citizens first and foremost, many of them natives of the cities of Ceuta and Melilla, both Muslim and Christian. They retain the traditional divisions of Grupos or Groups (regiments) and Tabores (battalions) as follows:

 Grupo de Infantería Ligera Regulares de Melilla nº 52 (Stationed in Melilla, Peñón de Vélez de la Gomera, Peñón de Alhucemas and Islas Chafarinas )
 Tabor Alhucemas I
 Tabor Rif II
 Grupo de Infantería Ligera Regulares de Ceuta nº 54 (Stationed in Ceuta )
 Tabor Tetuan II (motorized)
 Anti-tank company

Both the present regiments are also successors to regular infantry regiments of the Spanish Army, which formerly served in Melilla and Ceuta.

In recent years detachments of Regulares have served in peace missions both in Bosnia and Afghanistan.

Evolution 
In 1914 Regulares' forces were expanded with the creation of four regiments, titled Groups Each of these four groups consisted of the regimental headquarters, two Infantry Tabors (battalions) of three companies plus a Tabor of three cavalry troops/squadrons, together with support elements.

Specifically, the Groups of Indigenous Regular Forces were constituted as follows:

 1st Group of Indigenous Regular Forces "Tetuán", (Tetuan)
 2nd Group of Indigenous Regular Forces "Melilla" ( Melilla and Nador )
 3rd Group of Indigenous Regular Forces "Ceuta" ( Ceuta )
 4th Group of Indigenous Regular Forces "Larache" ( Arcila and Larache )

In 1921 and after the Battle of Annual a fifth unit was created:

 5th Group of Indigenous Regular Forces "Alhucemas", with HQ in Segangan .

After the Spanish Civil War, five new groups were raised:

 6th Group of Indigenous Regular Forces "Xauen", based in the city of Xaue.
 7th Group of Indigenous Regular Forces "Llano Amarillo", with headquarters in Cabrerizas, Mellilia. 
 8th Group of Indigenous Regular Forces "Rif", based in the Souk el Had, Beni Sicar
 9th Group of Indigenous Regular Forces "Arcila", based in the city of Alcazarquivir.
 10th Group of Indigenous Regular Forces "Bab-Taza", with barracks in Bab-Taza.

Two groups of cavalry were also raised, organized into a regimental HQ and three Tabors of cavalry squadrons/troops each:

 1st Group of Indigenous Cavalry Regular Forces Tetuán
 2nd Group of Independent Indigenous Cavalry Forces Melilla

Uniforms 

After a brief establishment period during which the Regulares wore white indigenous dress, the new corps was issued with uniforms modelled on those of the French zouaves. During 1913-14 these were replaced by simplified light khaki, worn with red fez caps and sashes. A tarbuch was worn, by the native officers and men, with a sand colored shirt and breeches with brown leather equipment. Spanish officers wore a sand colored variant of the standard Spanish Army uniform with a red topped peaked cap.

Currently the Regulares wear the same camouflage dress for active service and ordinary duties as the rest of the Spanish Army but retain a unique, khaki tropical uniform for semi-formal barrack dress and as the basis of its parade uniform. The most distinctive features of the modern Regulares uniform are the red fez, red or blue sashes and white cloaks (burnous) retained from the Moorish style dress uniforms worn prior to 1956.

Modern parade march 
These regiments and their attached battalions march in both quick and slow time on parade and only turn to the slow march when they are ready to render salutes on the march.

Military Music Units 
The military bands and Corps of drums of the Regulares regiments and Tabors are commonly known as the Nubas. They are the same as the normal Spanish Army military bands except that the Corps of Drums is a mix of drums, cymbals, tambourines, bugles, trumpets, bagpipes and chirimias or oboes. At the present time only the Corps of Drums is seen in continuous active service, with military band support usually from other units. It was led by a Bugle Major, who in the past was the assistant of the drum major, until in the 2014 National Day Parade the Corps of Drums of the 54th Regulares Group reinstated the practice of being led by a drum major which was formerly in force in the first decades. Personnel of the Nuba wear the same service dress as their comrades.

Depiction in popular culture 
The novel Kábila, by the Spanish author and journalist Fernando González Martín, is about a Moroccan who as a teenager hates the Spanish colonial troops but subsequently becomes a soldier of the Regulares, plays a major role in suppressing the Asturias repression and ends up as a high-ranking commanding officer in the military forces of Franco.
A famous  sung from the civil war times till now refers to these military units:

It remains a popular song that is often heard at any "jota" festival or contest.

Awards 

The personnel of units of the Regulares, for their role in both the "Pacification" of Morocco and for its participation in the intervention in Spain (mainly in the Civil War of 1936-1939), were awarded with a number of orders and medals by the government. Today the Regulares are the most decorated units of the Spanish Army. Among some of its many Laureates and medals obtained are:

 Laureate Cross of San Fernando:
 Lieutenant Samaniego del Tabor de Caballeria who died in 1912 in the combats and occupation of the Aduar of Haddu al-Lal Kadur. He is the first soldier of Regulares who obtains this decoration.
 Lieutenant Salustiano Sáenz de Tejada y Olózaga, awarded for his merits and death in the combat of 31 March 1924, when he took a convoy to the position of Issen Lassen.
 In 1915 for a doctor of Military Health, assigned to Regulares. 
 Laureate Cross of San Fernando (Collective Medal for Units):
 II Tabor of the 5th Group of Indigenous Regulars of Alhucemas, for the actions of Ciudad Universitaria (Parque del Oeste), November 1936.
 V Tabor of the Group of Indigenous Regulars of Ceuta No. 3, for the acts of weapons that occurred between 11/15/1936 and 5/19/1937 in the University City of Madrid. University City actions (Parque del Oeste) 
 Collective Military Medal:
 4th Group, by the action of Muires and Haman in 1920 .
 Group of Ceuta No. 3, for the combats of Barranco del Lobo and Casabona in 1921 .
 Group of Regular Infantry Forces of Melilla No. 2, for the actions of Tizzi Assa and Tifaruin, in 1923 .
 Group of Tetuán # 1, by the combats of Peñas de Cayat.
 Group of Indigenous Regulars Alhucemas No. 5, by the combats in the University City (Parque del Oeste) November 1936.
 V Tabor of the Group of Indigenous Regulars of Melilla No. 2, for their actions in the Battle of the Ebro 25 July 1938.
 V Tabor of the Group of Indigenous Regulars of Ceuta No. 3, for its brilliant behavior in the operations of Teruel, Maestrazgo and especially for the cycle of operations of the Ebro. November 1938.

See also 

 Spanish Army
 Army of Africa (Spain)
 Tiradores de Ifni, a similar force raised in Ifni
 Guardia Mora
 Goumier
 Spanish Legion
 Mohamed Meziane

References

Bibliography

External links 
 

Military history of Spain
Military units and formations of Spain
Military units and formations of the Spanish Civil War
Spanish Army
Military history of Morocco
Rif War
Military units and formations established in 1911
Colonial troops